Vitold Lvovich Shmulyan (29 August 1914 – 27 August 1944) was a Soviet mathematician known for his work in functional analysis. The Eberlein–Šmulian theorem and Krein–Smulian theorem are named after him.

Notes

Functional analysts
Soviet mathematicians
1914 births
1944 deaths